Perillus exaptus is a species of predatory stink bug in the family Pentatomidae. It is found in North America.

References

Asopinae
Articles created by Qbugbot
Insects described in 1825